The Slovakia women's national water polo team is the representative for Slovakia in international women's water polo. Slovakia will perform at the 2020 Women's European Water Polo Championship for the second time.

European Championship record
1993 – 12th
2020 – 8th
2022 – 12th

Current squad
Roster for the 2020 Women's European Water Polo Championship.

Head coach: Milan Heinrich

Under-20 team
Slovakia lastly competed at the 2021 FINA Junior Water Polo World Championships.

References

External links
 

Slovakia national water polo team
Women's national water polo teams
Women's sport in Slovakia